A Molotov cocktail (among several other names – see other names) is a hand thrown incendiary weapon constructed from a frangible container filled with flammable substances equipped with a fuse (typically a glass bottle filled with flammable liquids sealed with a cloth wick). In use, the fuse attached to the container is lit and the weapon is thrown, shattering on impact. This ignites the flammable substances contained in the bottle and spreads flames as the fuel burns.

Due to their relative ease of production, Molotov cocktails are typically improvised weapons. Their improvised usage spans from criminals, rioters, football hooligans, urban guerrillas, terrorists, irregular soldiers, freedom fighters, and even regular soldiers, in the latter case often due to a shortage of equivalent military-issued weapons. Despite its improvised and rebellious nature, many modern militaries exercise the use of Molotov cocktails.

However, Molotov cocktails are not always improvised in the field. It is not uncommon for them to be mass-produced to a certain standard as part of preparation for combat. Some examples of this being done are the anti-invasion preparations of the British Home Guard during WWII and the Ukrainian volunteer units during the 2022 Russian invasion of Ukraine. During World War II, Molotov cocktails were even factory produced in several countries, such as: Finland, Nazi Germany, the Soviet Union, Sweden and the United States, some featuring specially designed frangible containers and fuses (such as the US Frangible Grenade M1 for example).

Etymology 

The name "Molotov cocktail" was coined by the Finns during the Winter War in 1939. The name was a pejorative reference to Soviet foreign minister Vyacheslav Molotov, who was one of the architects of the Molotov–Ribbentrop Pact on the eve of World War II.

The name's origin came from the propaganda Molotov produced during the Winter War, mainly his declaration on Soviet state radio that incendiary bombing missions over Finland were actually "airborne humanitarian food deliveries" for their "starving" neighbours. As a result, the Finns sarcastically dubbed the Soviet incendiary cluster bombs "Molotov bread baskets" in reference to Molotov's propaganda broadcasts. When the hand-held bottle firebomb was developed to attack and destroy Soviet tanks, the Finns called it the "Molotov cocktail", as "a drink to go with his food parcels".

Despite the now infamous name, the formal Finnish military term for the weapon type was (and still is) actually "burn-bottle" (Fenno-Swedish: brännflaska).

Other names 
The weapon most often known as Molotov cocktail goes under a great variety of other names around the globe. Some are more formal than others but the weapon is often given a descriptive name in the respective language.

Common nicknames 

Bottle bomb
Bottle grenade
Burn bottle
Burning bottle
Fire bomb (not to be confused with other incendiary devices also known as firebombs)
Fire bottle
Flame bomb
Flame bottle
Gasoline bomb or Gas bomb – due to gasoline being a common filler (latter not to be confused with tear gas)
Incendiary bottle
Molly – abbreviation of Molotov cocktail (commonly used in video games)
Molotov – abbreviation of Molotov cocktail
Petrol bomb – due to petrol being a common filler
Poor man's grenade – due to its improvised nature

Military names (international) 
 – , ('burn-bottle') – Fenno-Swedish:  ('burn-bottle')
 – 
 –  ('fire bottle') –  ('fire hand grenade')
 –  – 
 –  ('burn-bottle')
 – frangible grenade – incendiary frangible grenade – incendiary bottle grenade

Design 
A Molotov cocktail is a glass bottle containing a flammable substance such as petrol (gasoline), alcohol or a napalm-like mixture and a source of ignition, such as a burning cloth wick, held in place by the bottle's stopper. The wick is usually soaked in alcohol or kerosene rather than petrol. For winter warfare, a method of ignition has been to attach storm matches to the side of the bottle, as these are less likely to be put out by wind. Some examples are fitted with ballast for improved throwing accuracy (such as filling  of the bottle with sand).

In action, the wick/match is lit and the bottle hurled at a target such as a vehicle or fortification. When the bottle smashes on impact, the ensuing cloud of fuel droplets and vapour is ignited by the attached wick, causing an immediate fireball followed by spreading flames as the remainder of the fuel is consumed.

Other flammable liquids, such as diesel fuel, methanol, turpentine, jet fuel, acetone, and isopropyl alcohol (rubbing alcohol), have been used in place of, or combined with, petrol. Thickening agents, such as solvents, extruded polystyrene (XPS) foam (known colloquially as styrofoam), baking soda, petroleum jelly, tar, strips of tyre tubing, nitrocellulose, motor oil, rubber cement, detergent and dish soap, have been added to promote adhesion of the burning liquid and to create clouds of thick, choking smoke. There also exist variations on the Molotov cocktail-concept where the bottle is filled with a smoke generating mixture such as sulfur trioxide solved in chlorosulfonic acid. These so-called "smoke bottles" do not need a source for ignition, as the mixture reacts with the air once the bottle is smashed.

Development and use in war

Spanish Civil War 

Improvised incendiary devices of this type were used in warfare for the first time in the Spanish Civil War between July 1936 and April 1939, before they became known as "Molotov cocktails". After that, both sides used simple petrol bombs set fire with toxic gas or petrol-soaked blankets with some success. Tom Wintringham, a veteran of the International Brigades, later publicised his recommended method of using them:

Khalkhin Gol 
The Battle of Khalkhin Gol, a border conflict of 1939 ostensibly between Mongolia and Manchukuo, saw heavy fighting between Japanese and Soviet forces. Short of anti-tank equipment, Japanese infantry attacked Soviet tanks with gasoline-filled bottles. Japanese infantrymen claimed that several hundred Soviet tanks had been destroyed this way, though Soviet loss records do not support this assessment.

World War II

Finland 

On 30 November 1939, the Soviet Union attacked Finland, starting what came to be known as the Winter War. The Finnish perfected the design and tactical use of the petrol bomb. The fuel for the Molotov cocktail was refined to a slightly sticky mixture of alcohol, kerosene, tar, and potassium chlorate. Further refinements included the attachment of wind-proof matches or a phial of chemicals that would ignite on breakage, thereby removing the need to pre-ignite the bottle, and leaving the bottle about one-third empty was found to make breaking more likely.

A British War Office report dated June 1940 noted that:

Molotov cocktails were eventually mass-produced by the Alko corporation at its Rajamäki distillery, bundled with matches to light them. A  bottle was filled with a mixture of petrol and paraffin, plus a small amount of tar. The basic bottle had two long pyrotechnic storm matches attached to either side. Before use, one or both of the matches was lit; when the bottle broke on impact, the mixture ignited. The storm matches were found to be safer to use than a burning rag on the mouth of the bottle. There was also an "A bottle". This replaced the matches with a small ampoule inside the bottle; it ignited when the bottle broke. By Spring 1940 they had produced 542,104 bottles.

Great Britain 

Early in 1940, with the prospect of immediate invasion, the possibilities of the petrol bomb gripped the imagination of the British public. For laypersons, the petrol bomb had the benefit of using entirely familiar and available materials, and they were quickly improvised in large numbers, with the intention of using them against enemy tanks.

The Finns had found that they were effective when used in the right way and in sufficient numbers. Although the experience of the Spanish Civil War received more publicity, the more sophisticated petroleum warfare tactics of the Finns were not lost on British commanders. In his 5 June address to LDV leaders, General Ironside said:

Wintringham advised that a tank that was isolated from supporting infantry was potentially vulnerable to men who had the required determination and cunning to get close. Rifles or even a shotgun would be sufficient to persuade the crew to close all the hatches, and then the view from the tank is very limited; a turret-mounted machine gun has a very slow traverse and cannot hope to fend off attackers coming from all directions. Once sufficiently close, it is possible to hide where the tank's gunner cannot see: "The most dangerous distance away from a tank is 200 yards; the safest distance is six inches." Petrol bombs will soon produce a pall of blinding smoke, and a well-placed explosive package or even a stout iron bar in the tracks can immobilise the vehicle, leaving it at the mercy of further petrol bombs – which will suffocate the engine and possibly the crew – or an explosive charge or anti-tank mine.

By August 1940, the War Office produced training instructions for the creation and use of Molotov cocktails. The instructions suggested scoring the bottles vertically with a diamond to ensure breakage and providing fuel-soaked rag, windproof matches or a length of cinema film (then composed of highly flammable nitrocellulose) as a source of ignition.

On 29 July 1940, manufacturers Albright & Wilson of Oldbury demonstrated to the RAF how their white phosphorus could be used to ignite incendiary bombs. The demonstration involved throwing glass bottles containing a mixture of petrol and phosphorus at pieces of wood and into a hut. On breaking, the phosphorus was exposed to the air and spontaneously ignited; the petrol also burned, resulting in a fierce fire. Because of safety concerns, the RAF was not interested in white phosphorus as a source of ignition, but the idea of a self-igniting petrol bomb took hold. Initially known as an A.W. bomb, it was officially named the No. 76 Grenade, but more commonly known as the SIP (Self-Igniting Phosphorus) grenade. The perfected list of ingredients was white phosphorus, benzene, water and a two-inch strip of raw rubber; all in a half-pint bottle sealed with a crown stopper. Over time, the rubber would slowly dissolve, making the contents slightly sticky, and the mixture would separate into two layers – this was intentional, and the grenade should not be shaken to mix the layers, as this would only delay ignition. When thrown against a hard surface, the glass would shatter and the contents would instantly ignite, liberating choking fumes of phosphorus pentoxide and sulfur dioxide as well as producing a great deal of heat. Strict instructions were issued to store the grenades safely, preferably underwater and certainly never in a house. Mainly issued to the Home Guard as an anti-tank weapon, it was produced in vast numbers; by August 1941 well over 6,000,000 had been manufactured.

There were many who were sceptical about the efficacy of Molotov cocktails and SIPs grenades against the more modern German tanks. Weapon designer Stuart Macrae witnessed a trial of the SIPs grenade at Farnborough: "There was some concern that, if the tank drivers could not pull up quickly enough and hop out, they were likely to be frizzled to death, but after looking at the bottles they said they would be happy to take a chance." The drivers were proved right, trials on modern British tanks confirmed that Molotov and SIP grenades caused the occupants of the tanks "no inconvenience whatsoever."

Wintringham, though enthusiastic about improvised weapons, cautioned against a reliance on petrol bombs and repeatedly emphasised the importance of using explosive charges.

United States 
The US army designated Molotov cocktails as frangible grenades. They presented a notable amount of variations, from those that used thin fuel with varied ignition systems, to those that used obscurants and chemical weapons. Various frangible grenade designs were developed, with those investiged by the NDRC showing the highest technological level. These incendiary devices employed the most technologically advanced fillers in the conflict. 

The M1 frangible grenade was the standard US device, but each division of the army could come up with its own. Two non-industrial models of these grenades were developed and manufactured in a certain quantity. In all, about five thousand were manufactured. The frangible grenades featured standardized chemical igniters, some were specific to each flammable filler.

Most of the frangible devices were made in an improvised way, with no standardization regarding the bottle and filling.  The frangible grenades were eventually declared obsolete,  due to the very limited destructive effect.

1107 frangible, M1, NP type were supplied to the navy and its units for field use at Iwo Jima.

Other fronts of World War II 
The Polish Home Army developed a version which ignited on impact without the need of a wick. Ignition was caused by a reaction between concentrated sulfuric acid mixed with the fuel and a mixture of potassium chlorate and sugar which was crystallized from solution onto a rag attached to the bottle.

During the Norwegian campaign in 1940 the Norwegian Army lacking suitable anti-tank weaponry had to rely on petrol bombs and other improvised weapons to fight German armored vehicles. Instructions from Norwegian High Command sent to army units in April 1940 encouraged soldiers to start ad-hoc production of "Hitler cocktails" (a different take on the Finnish nickname for the weapon) to combat tanks and armored cars. During the campaign there were instances of petrol bombs being relatively effective against the lighter tanks employed in Norway by Germany, such as the Panzer I and Panzer II.

The United States Marine Corps developed a version during World War II that used a tube of nitric acid and a lump of metallic sodium to ignite a mixture of petrol and diesel fuel.

Modern warfare 

During the Second Battle of Fallujah in 2004, U.S. Marines employed Molotov cocktails made with "one part liquid laundry detergent, two parts gas" while clearing houses "when contact is made in a house and the enemy must be burned out". The tactic "was developed in response to the enemy's tactics" of guerrilla warfare and particularly martyrdom tactics which often resulted in U.S. Marine casualties. The cocktail was a less expedient alternative to white phosphorus mortar rounds or propane tanks detonated with C4 (nicknamed the "House Guest"), all of which proved effective at burning out engaged enemy combatants.

During the 2022 Russian invasion of Ukraine, the Ukrainian Defense Ministry told civilians to make Molotov cocktails, locally called "Bandera smoothies", to fight Russian troops. The defense ministry distributed a recipe for producing Molotov cocktails to civilians through Ukrainian television, which included the use of styrofoam as a thickening agent to aid in helping the burning liquid stick to vehicles or other targets. The Pravda Brewery of Lviv, which converted from making beer to Molotov cocktails, said that their recipe was "3 cups polystyrene, 2 cups grated soap, 500 millilitres gasoline, 100 millilitres oil, 1 jumbo tampon fuse." The Russian media control organisation Roskomnadzor sued Twitter for not removing instructions for how to prepare and use molotov cocktails, so that Twitter had to pay a fine of 3 million roubles (US$41,000).

Civilian use 

Molotov cocktails were reportedly used in the United States for arson attacks on shops and other buildings during the 1992 Los Angeles riots.

Molotov cocktails were also used by protesters and civilian militia in Ukraine during violent outbreaks of the Euromaidan and the Revolution of Dignity. Protesters during the Ferguson riots used Molotov cocktails.

In Bangladesh during anti government protests at the time of the 2014 national election, many buses and cars were targeted with petrol bombs. A number of people burnt to death and many more were injured during the period 2013–2014 due to petrol bomb attacks.

In the 2019–20 Hong Kong protests, protesters used Molotov cocktails against the police or to create roadblocks. Protesters also attacked an MTR station and caused severe damage. A journalist was also hit by a Molotov cocktail during the protests.

Molotov cocktails were used by some during the George Floyd riots of 2020 in the United States.

Non-incendiary variants 

During the protests in Venezuela from 2014 and into 2017, protesters had been using Molotov cocktails similar to those used by demonstrators in other countries. As the 2017 Venezuelan protests intensified, demonstrators began using "Puputovs", a play on words of Molotov, with glass devices filled with excrement being thrown at authorities after the PSUV ruling-party official, Jacqueline Faría, mocked protesters who had to crawl through sewage in Caracas' Guaire River to avoid tear gas.

On 8 May, the hashtag #puputov became the top trend on Twitter in Venezuela as reports of authorities vomiting after being drenched in excrement began to circulate. A month later on 4 June 2017 during protests against Donald Trump in Portland, Oregon, police claimed protesters began throwing balloons filled with "unknown, foul-smelling liquid" at officers.

Legality 
As incendiary devices, Molotov cocktails are illegal to manufacture or possess in many regions. In the United States, Molotov cocktails are considered "destructive devices" under the National Firearms Act and are regulated by the ATF. Wil Casey Floyd, from Elkhart Lake, Wisconsin, was arrested after throwing Molotov cocktails at Seattle police officers during a protest in May 2016; he pleaded guilty for using the incendiary devices in February 2018.

In Simpson County, Kentucky, 20-year-old Trey Alexander Gwathney-Law attempted to burn Franklin-Simpson County Middle School with five Molotov cocktails; he was found guilty of making and possessing illegal firearms and was sentenced to 20 years in prison in 2018.

Symbolism 

Due to the Molotov's ease of production and use by civilian forces, the Molotov cocktail has become a symbol of civil uprising and revolution. The Molotov's extensive use by civilian, and partisan forces has also thereby led to the Molotov becoming a symbol representing civil unrest. The Molotov has strong association with anarchism due to anarchists' use of the Molotov, and anarchists engaging in civil uprisings and unrest across the world, with protesters organizing from Chile and Iran, to Egypt and Hong Kong. The contrast of a Molotov cocktail and an organized force has become a popular symbol in popular culture, and often utilized as a weapon in various video games.

Gallery

See also

References

Specific

Works cited

Collections

External links 

 A detailed technology of the Molotov cocktail
 History of the Molotov cocktail by William R. Trotter
 Homemade Tank Bomb  June 1941 Popular Science showing US public the Molotov Cocktail as used in the European Wars
 A Thousand Lakes of Red Blood on White Snow, a brief history of the subarctic origins of the Molotov cocktail in the Russo-Finnish Winter War of 1939–40

Bombs
Incendiary grenades
Incendiary weapons
Urban guerrilla warfare
World War II infantry weapons of the Soviet Union
World War II infantry weapons of the United Kingdom
World War II infantry weapons of Poland
World War II infantry weapons of Germany
World War II infantry weapons of Italy
World War II military equipment of Finland
Finland–Soviet Union relations
Spanish inventions
Insurgency weapons
Hand grenades
Finnish inventions
20th-century neologisms
Improvised weapons
Improvised explosive devices